Teen-Age Crime Wave (aka Teenage Crime Wave) is a 1955 American juvenile delinquency film noir crime film directed by Fred F. Sears and starring Tommy Cook and Molly McCart. It was released by Columbia Pictures. The plot concerns a pair of delinquent teens who go on a statewide shooting spree after escaping from reform school.

It was featured on a 1994 episode of Mystery Science Theater 3000.

Plot
Jane Koberly, accidentally present during a robbery, is falsely convicted of being an accessory. While being transferred to an industrial school with her cellmate Terry Marsh, Terry's boyfriend Mike Denton springs them, killing a deputy in the process. With the police hot on their trail, they take over a farmhouse owned by the Grants and terrorize the family while waiting for their friend Al to arrive with money and transport.  The Grants' son Ben arrives for Thanksgiving, and is also held hostage.  As time passes, Mike becomes more unhinged as Terry flirts with Ben.  The criminals are forced to flee after killing a neighbor of the Grants.  The fugitives are cornered at the Griffith Observatory, where Terry is fatally shot by the police, and Mike is subdued by Ben.  Before she dies, Terry confesses to the police that Jane is innocent.  When Mike is taken to Terry's dead body, he breaks down and cries hysterically.

Cast
 Tommy Cook as Mike Denton
 Molly McCart as Terry Marsh (as Mollie McCart)
 Sue England as Jane Koberly
 Frank Griffin as Benjamin David 'Ben' Grant 
 James Bell as Thomas Paul Grant
 Kay Riehl as Sarah Wayne Grant
 Guy Kingsford as Mr. Koberly
 Larry J. Blake as State Police Sgt. Connors (as Larry Blake)

Mystery Science Theater 3000
Teen-Age Crime Wave was shown as episode #522 of Mystery Science Theater 3000. The episode debuted January 15, 1994. Among fans, the episode has a middling reputation. It did not make the Top 100 list of episodes as voted upon by MST3K Season 11 Kickstarter backers. Writer Jim Vorel ranked the episode #82 (out of 191 total MST3K episodes), judging it a solid episode; he claims, "The film is quite solid, a melodramatic 'teens in trouble' flick ... and it receives a thorough riffing. But every one of the sketches is memorable, and indicative of the wilder, more high-energy tone that came into the show after Mike became the host."

The MST3K version of Teen-Age Crime Wave was included as part of the Mystery Science Theater 3000 Volume XXXIII DVD collection, released by Shout! Factory in July 2015. The other episodes in the four-disc set include Daddy-O (episode #307), Earth vs. the Spider (episode #313), and Agent for H.A.R.M. (episode #815).

References

External links 
 

1955 films
Columbia Pictures films
American crime drama films
1955 crime drama films
Films directed by Fred F. Sears
Films about juvenile delinquency
1950s English-language films
1950s American films
American black-and-white films